Begonia hispida, the piggyback begonia (a name only applied to individuals with leaflets), is a species of flowering plant in the family Begoniaceae, native to southeastern and southern Brazil. They are occasionally cultivated due to their "piggyback" leaflets which grow directly from veins in the main leaves. The piggyback mutation is also seen in Arabidopsis.

References

hispida
Endemic flora of Brazil
Flora of Southeast Brazil
Flora of South Brazil
Plants described in 1861